Gilbert Darrell (1923–2018) was a Bermuda politician and businessperson. He was a co-founder and former leader of the National Liberal Party.

He was first elected to the House of Assembly of Bermuda in 1963 as an independent.

References

1923 births
2018 deaths

Members of the House of Assembly of Bermuda